Flight 17  may refer to:

PIA Flight 17, crashed on 2 February 1966
Evergreen International Airlines Flight 17, crashed on 18 March 1989
Emery Worldwide Flight 17, crashed on 16 February 2000
Malaysia Airlines Flight 17, shot down on 17 July 2014

0017